Polosin is a Russian masculine surname, its feminine counterpart is Polosina. It may refer to
Alexey Polosin (1924–1943), Soviet military officer
Anatoli Polosin (1935–1997), Russian football coach
Vyacheslav Polosin (born 1956), Russian Muslim academic 

Russian-language surnames